Ellis Island was the gateway for over 20 million immigrants to the United States as the nation's busiest immigrant inspection station for over sixty years from 1892 until 1954. The island, in Upper New York Bay, was greatly expanded with land reclamation between 1892 and 1934. Before that, the much smaller original island was the site of Fort Gibson and later a naval magazine. The island was made part of the Statue of Liberty National Monument in 1965 and has hosted a museum of immigration since 1990.

Below is a list of Ellis Island immigrants who attained notability in the United States.

See also
 Lists of Americans
 List of naturalized American citizens

References
Notes

Bibliography

 

 
 Ellis Island
Ellis Island Immigrants, List Of
Ellis Island Immigrants, List Of